{
  "type": "ExternalData",
  "service": "geoshape",
  "ids": "Q14874265",
  "title": "Mount Vernon Camp"
}

Mount Vernon Camp, also known as the Gurkha Cantonment, is an establishment of the Singapore Police Force built to house the training and residential facilities of the Gurkha Contingent's Gurkhas and their families. 

Located at Mount Vernon near to the secludedness of the Bidadari Cemetery, it has undergone expansion on the hilly terrain, particularly with the introduction of modern, high quality high-rise housing blocks for the over 2,000 officers and their families-in-tow.

The road leading into the camp is named Kathmandu Road for the capital city of Nepal. Built as a self-contained complex due to security concerns to minimise movements into and out of the complex, it has its own shops, schools and even playgrounds for the younger children, which contingent commander Bruce M. Niven equates to being a township all on its own.

Dwellers in the complex are not prohibited from leaving the camp or utilising services and facilities outside it. Throngs of school-going Nepalese children regularly leave and enter the camp everyday, wearing the uniforms of national schools. The camp's close proximity to Bartley Secondary School has seen a significant number of Nepalese children being enrolled there, although they can also be found in schools much further away as the children become gradually assimilated into Singapore society and culture. First Toa Payoh Primary School is one of the few primary schools where the Gurkha's children are enrolled in. 

The surrounding commercial outlets thrive on business brought about by the Nepalese community based here, and it is a common sight to see officers doing their daily recreational runs around the major roads close to the camp.

Phase 2B of the complex expansion commenced in 2001, costing a total of S$42.2 million and has added 93,568m2 of largely residential space. Designed by PWD Consultants and built by the China Construction (South Pacific) Development Co., it was completed by 2003. The complex continues to undergo physical upgrading works today, with the government setting aside another S$47.8 million for the expansion works being carried out from 2004 into 2006.

References

External links
Hindu Warriors Guard Singapore From Terror

Gurkha Contingent
Singapore Police Force
Aljunied